John Mark Hawkins (born 30 April 1960) is a British diplomat.

Hawkins was educated at Bedford School and at New College, Oxford, where he read Modern History.  He joined the British Diplomatic Service in 1982 and, following diplomatic postings in South Africa, India, Spain and Dubai, he served as British Ambassador to Qatar between 2008 and 2012.

References

1960 births
People educated at Bedford School
Alumni of New College, Oxford
Ambassadors of the United Kingdom to Qatar
Members of HM Diplomatic Service
Living people
20th-century British diplomats